The name Sachin is derived, via Indic languages like Bengali and Marathi, from the Sanskrit name Shachindra. Shachindra is a name given to Hindu god Indra which means Shachi's Indra. Shachi was one of the wives of Indra. It is also a name of Hindu god Shiva. The literal meaning can be roughly translated into English as "the essence".

People with the name

 Sachin (actor) (Sachin Pilgaonkar) (born 1957), Indian Bollywood actor
 Sachin Ahir (born 1972), Indian politician
 Sachin Baby (born 1988), Indian cricketer
 Sachin Bhowmick (1930–2011), Indian Hindi film writer and director
 Sachin Dev Burman (1906–1975), Indian music composer, singer
 Sachin Chaudhary (born 1983), Indian powerlifter
 Sachin Gupta (born 1978), Indian playwright and theatre director
 Sachin Gupta (musician) (born 1981), Indian music director, composer, guitar player, record producer and singer
 Sachin H. Jain (born 1980), American physician and health policy analyst
 Sachin Khedekar (born 1965), Indian actor and director 
 Sachin Kundalkar, Indian film director and screenwriter
 Sachin Lawande, Indian American businessman
 Sachin Mylavarapu (born 1991), Singaporean cricketer
 Sachin Nag (1920-1987), Indian swimmer 
 Sachin Nair (born 1978), Indian cricketer
 Sachin Nayak (born 1982), Indian actor
 Sachin Patel (born 1979), Indian cricketer
 Sachin Pilot (born 1977), Indian politician
 Sachin Puthran, Indian entrepreneur
 Sachin Rana (born 1984), Indian cricketer
 Sachin Sengupta (1891-1961), Bengali playwright and theatre producer
 Sachin Shroff (born 1972), Indian businessman and TV personality
 Sachin Singh (born 1967), Nepali musician
 Sachin Tendulkar (born 1973), Indian cricketer
 Sachin Waze (born 1972), Indian police officer
 Sachin Yardi, Indian film director and screenwriter

See also
 Sachin (disambiguation)

References